GVD is a chemotherapy regimen, used for salvage treatment of relapsed or refractory Hodgkin disease, including those patients who relapse after stem cell transplantation. 

The GVD regimen consists of three drugs, from which its name is derived:
 Gemcitabine;
 Vinorelbine; and
 Doxil, a pegylated liposomal formulation of doxorubicin.


Dosing 

Repeated every 21 days (3 weeks).

References 

Chemotherapy regimens used in lymphoma